Christiania Fusel & Blaagress was a band started at Øystein Sunde's home after an evening at the Dolphin Club in Oslo on February 18, 1968. Its first performance was on February 22 the same year. The original membership of the band was:

 Kari Svendsen (banjo, tuba/baritone)
 Gerd Gudding (fiddle)
 Anne Elisenberg (fiddle, washboard)
 Fredrik Wibe (bass, washtub bass)
 Kåre Schanche (guitar)
 Øystein Sunde (guitar, mandolin)

The band performed live for many years but released only one single, "Det kjem nok betre tider" / "Mamma vi’kke ha" (Better Times a-Comin' / Mama Don't Allow), and one album, Som varmt hvetebrød i tørt gress (Like Hotcakes in Dry Grass).

References

External links
NRK TV: Christiania Fusel & Blaagress playing "Fanitullen" (The Devil's Tune) in 1973.

Norwegian musical groups
Musical groups established in 1968
1968 establishments in Norway
Year of disestablishment missing